Notarthrinus is a butterfly genus in the family Lycaenidae. It is monotypic, containing only Notarthrinus binghami, the Chapman's hedge blue, a small butterfly found from Assam in India to northern Myanmar.

Cited references

References
 

Polyommatini
Butterflies of Asia
Monotypic butterfly genera
Lycaenidae genera